The 1836 Maine gubernatorial election took place on September 12, 1836. Incumbent Democratic Governor Robert P. Dunlap won re-election to a fourth term.

Results

References

Gubernatorial
1836
Maine
September 1836 events